Charles Montague Sawyer (20 March 1856 – 30 March 1921) was an English cricketer, and rugby union footballer who played in the 1880s and early 1890s. He played representative level cricket for Lancashire, Gentlemen of Lancashire, and at club level for Broughton Cricket Club , and representative level rugby union (RU) for England, and at club level for Broughton RUFC and  Southport RFC, as a Three-quarters, e.g. Wing, or Centre.

Cricket
Charles Sawyer was born in Rusholme, Greater Manchester, and he died aged 65 in Ormskirk, Lancashire.

County honours
He appeared in two first-class matches in 1884 as a right-handed batsman, scoring 21 runs with a highest score of 11*.

Rugby

International honours
Charles Sawyer won caps for England while at Broughton RUFC in the 1879–80 Home Nations rugby union matches against Scotland, and scored a try in the 1880–81 Home Nations rugby union matches against Ireland.

In the early years of rugby football the goal was to score goals, and a try had zero value, but it provided the opportunity to try at goal, and convert the try to a goal with an unopposed kick at the goal posts. The point values of both the try and goal have varied over time, and in the early years footballers could "score" a try, without scoring any points.

Sawyer finished his career at  Southport RFC.

Genealogical information
Charles Sawyer's marriage was registered during July→September 1886 in Altrincham district. They had children; Charles Quinton Sawyer (birth registered during October→December 1891 in Altrincham district, born in Knutsford, Cheshire, England – 14 July 1916, Battle of the Somme, France) who played cricket for Sedbergh School in 1908.. Charles Sawyer was the brother of; W. S. Sawyer (cricketer for Broughton Cricket Club (1876-1880)), and Lancashire Colts (1881)), and J. S. Sawyer (cricketer for Broughton Cricket Club (1879), and rugby player for Broughton RUFC, and The North of England rugby union team (1879-1881)).

References

External links
Statistics at espnscrum.com

1856 births
1921 deaths
Broughton RUFC players
England international rugby union players
English cricketers
English rugby union players
Lancashire cricketers
People from Rusholme
Rugby union players from Greater Manchester
Rugby union halfbacks